Nakatomi may refer to:

Nakatomi clan, an influential clan in ancient Japan
Die Hard: Nakatomi Plaza, a first-person shooter video game
Nakatomi Corporation, a fictional corporation in the motion picture Die Hard and its sequels
 Nakatomi (group), a Dutch happy-hardcore act

See also:
Fox Plaza (Los Angeles), used as the fictional building Nakatomi Plaza, in the movie Die Hard